Daniel Washabaugh (October 17, 1803 – January 10, 1894) was an American legislator and public official.

Born near Hagerstown, Maryland, Washabaugh moved to Chambersburg, Pennsylvania and then to Bedford, Pennsylvania. He served in the Pennsylvania House of Representatives as a Whig in 1841. He also served as a prothonotary for Bedford County, Pennsylvania. He died in Everett, Pennsylvania. His son was Frank J. Washabaugh who was a South Dakota legislator and jurist.

Notes

1803 births
1894 deaths
Politicians from Hagerstown, Maryland
People from Bedford, Pennsylvania
Pennsylvania Whigs
19th-century American politicians
Pennsylvania prothonotaries
Members of the Pennsylvania House of Representatives